Tripotamia (Greek: Τριποταμιά meaning "three rivers", before 1927: Μπέλεσι - Belesi) is a village and a community in the municipal unit of Tropaia in the westernmost part of Arcadia, Peloponnese, Greece. It is situated on a hill above the left bank of the river Erymanthos, 3 km north of its confluence with the Alfeios. The Ladon, another tributary of the Alfeios, flows 2 km east of Tripotamia. The rivers Erymanthos and Alfeios form the border with Elis here. The community consists of the villages Tripotamia, Kapellitsa and Chania. The Greek National Road 74 (Pyrgos - Olympia - Tripoli) passes north of the village. Tripotamia is 2 km east of Aspra Spitia, 6 km southwest of Liodora and 15 km east of Olympia.

Historical population

See also
List of settlements in Arcadia

External links
History and information about Tripotamia

References

Populated places in Arcadia, Peloponnese